Gradišče pri Vipavi is a village close to the source of the Vipava River, just south of the town of Vipava in the Littoral region of Slovenia.

Name
The name of the settlement was changed from Gradišče to Gradišče pri Vipavi in 1953.

Church

The local church in the settlement is dedicated to the Holy Cross and belongs to the Parish of Vipava.

References

External links
Gradišče pri Vipavi at Geopedia

Populated places in the Municipality of Vipava